New Cathedral Street is a pedestrianised retail street in Manchester city centre, England. It runs between Exchange Square and Exchange Street (off St Mary's Gate, Manchester). The street is home to the Manchester branch of Marks and Spencer and Selfridges (east side), and Harvey Nichols, the largest Ted Baker and Hugo Boss stores outside London, Lacoste, Louis Vuitton, Reiss, Henri Lloyd, Massimo, Zara and Burberry (west side).

The street and buildings that stand today were all built as part of the rebuilding since the 1996 IRA bombing of the city centre. The block of buildings to the west are on the site of the former Victoria Street and Victoria Buildings which were aligned differently.

Cathedral Street is an older street to the east of the cathedral and further to the north.

Footnotes

Sources
 Hartwell, Clare (2001) Manchester. (Pevsner Architectural Guides.) New Haven: Yale U. P. 

Streets in Manchester
Tourist attractions in Manchester
Odonyms referring to a building
Odonyms referring to religion